"Forward Rebels", also known as "Rebel March", is the fight song for the University of Mississippi. It is played by the Ole Miss "The Pride of the South" marching band at official university sporting events.

External links
Song recording
Lyrics source: "Forward Rebels." Forward Rebels lyrics at OleMissSports.com. Retrieved on October 23, 2009.

References

University of Mississippi
American college songs
College fight songs in the United States
Southeastern Conference fight songs
Year of song missing